The Battle of Susa was a battle involving Assyrians and Elamites. The Assyrian king Ashurbanipal, had grown tired of the Elamites' attacks on the Mesopotamians, and he decided to destroy Susa as punishment.

In 647 BC, the Assyrian king Ashurbanipal leveled the city during a war in which the people of Susa apparently participated on the other side. A tablet unearthed in 1854 by Austen Henry Layard in Nineveh reveals Ashurbanipal as an "avenger", seeking retribution for the humiliations the Elamites had inflicted on the Mesopotamians over the centuries. Ashurbanipal dictates Assyrian retribution after his successful siege of Susa:

References

Susa
Susa
7th century BC
647 BC
Susa
Elam